General elections were held in Saint Kitts-Nevis-Anguilla on 25 July 1966. The result was a victory for the Saint Kitts-Nevis-Anguilla Labour Party, which won seven of the ten seats. Voter turnout was 70.2%.

Results

References

Saint Kitts
Elections in Saint Kitts and Nevis
1966 in Saint Kitts-Nevis-Anguilla
Elections in Anguilla
July 1966 events in North America
Saint Kitts